Specklinia brenneri is a species of orchid described by Carlyle A. Luer and named for Joe Brenner, formerly of Puyo, Ecuador, who collected this species. Originally described as Pleurothallis brenneri, this species is common in several areas of southeastern Ecuador in relatively dry scrub forest at high altitudes.

References 

Endemic orchids of Ecuador
Plants described in 1976